Danielle Taylor may refer to:
 Danielle Taylor (fighter) (born 1989), American mixed martial artist
 Danielle Taylor (footballer) (born 1984), New Zealand football player
 Danielle Taylor (musician), American singer-songwriter